Jason Pernell Boyd (born February 23, 1973) is an American former professional baseball pitcher who played in Major League Baseball (MLB) for the Pittsburgh Pirates, Philadelphia Phillies, San Diego Padres and Cleveland Indians.

References

External links

1973 births
Living people
Baseball players from Illinois
Major League Baseball pitchers
Cleveland Indians players
San Diego Padres players
Buffalo Bisons (minor league) players
Pittsburgh Pirates players
Tucson Sidewinders players
Nashville Sounds players
Pawtucket Red Sox players
Portland Beavers players
Martinsville Phillies players
Piedmont Phillies players
Clearwater Phillies players
Reading Phillies players
Scranton/Wilkes-Barre Red Barons players
Bakersfield Blaze players
John A. Logan Volunteers baseball players